Sandercock may refer to:

People
Frank Sandercock (1887–1942), a Canadian ice hockey administrator
Elmer Sandercock (1894–1971), a Canadian politician
Leonie Sandercock (born 1949), an Australian academic and urban planner
Phil Sandercock (born 1953), an English professional footballer
Craig Sandercock, an Australian rugby league coach
Graham Sandercock, a Cornish author

Other
Sandercock Nunataks, an isolated group of nunataks about 45 miles east-southeast of the Nye Mountains in Enderby Land, Antarctica